Marcos Amalbert (born 9 April 1988) is a retired Puerto Rican long jumper.

As a junior he won the bronze medal at the 2004 Central American and Caribbean Junior Championships and also at the 2010 NACAC Under-23 Championships. He finished eleventh at the 2010 Ibero-American Championships, fifth at the 2010 Central American and Caribbean Games, eleventh at the 2011 Pan American Games, fifth at the 2011 Central American and Caribbean Championships and seventh at the 2012 Ibero-American Championships

Alambert also won a gold medal in the 4 × 100 metres relay at the 2010 Ibero-American Championships, and competed in the same event 2011 Pan American Games and the 2011 World Championships without reaching the final.

His personal best jump is 7.92 metres, achieved in May 2011 in Bogotá.

References

1988 births
Living people
Puerto Rican male long jumpers
World Athletics Championships athletes for Puerto Rico

Competitors at the 2010 Central American and Caribbean Games
Pan American Games competitors for Puerto Rico
Competitors at the 2011 Pan American Games
21st-century Puerto Rican people